IBM Informix is a product family within IBM's Information Management division that is centered on several relational database management system (RDBMS) offerings.  The Informix products were originally developed by Informix Corporation, whose Informix Software subsidiary was acquired by IBM in 2001.  In April 2017, IBM delegated active development and support to HCL Technologies for 15 years while keeping part of the marketing responsibilities.

The current version of Informix is 14.10 and forms the basis of several product editions with variation in capacity and functionality.   The Informix database has been used in many high transaction rate OLTP applications in the retail, finance, energy and utilities, manufacturing and transportation sectors. More recently the server has been enhanced to improve its support for data warehouse workloads. Through extensions, Informix supports data types that are not a part of the SQL standard.

Key products
As of 2020, the current version of IBM Informix is 14.10. The major enhancements made over previous releases were adding built-in index compression, integration of JSON collections with support for MongoDB JSON drivers into the server, and an enhancement permitting database objects to be partitioned across multiple servers in a cluster or grid (aka sharding).  Queries can optionally return data from the locally connected server instance or from an entire grid with the same SQL. Informix version 14.10 introduced support for partial indexing where only a subset of the rows in a table are indexed and for multi-valued key indexes which support indexing the elements within multi-valued data types such as LIST, SET, MULTISET, and BSON array fields.

Heterogeneous clusters are fully supported, and there are several deployment options that are available, including some that provide very high levels of data redundancy and fault tolerance.  This feature is marketed by IBM as Informix Flexible Grid.

Informix is offered in a number of editions, including free developer editions, editions for small and mid-sized business, and editions supporting the complete feature set and designed to be used in support of the largest enterprise applications. There is also an advanced data warehouse edition of Informix. This version includes the Informix Warehouse Accelerator which uses a combination of newer technologies including in-memory data, tokenization, deep compression, and columnar database technology to provide extreme high performance on business intelligence and data warehouse style queries.

Positioning
IBM has expanded the variety of database products it offers, such as Netezza, a data warehouse appliance, and Cloudant, a NoSQL database.  IBM has described its approach to the market as providing "workload optimized systems." Informix is generally considered to be optimized for environments with very low or no database administration, including use as an embedded database. It has a long track record of supporting very high transaction rates and providing uptime characteristics needed for mission critical applications such as manufacturing lines and reservation systems. Informix has been widely deployed in the retail sector, where the low administration overhead makes it useful for in-store deployments.

With the ability to deeply embed Informix in gateways and routers, timeseries support, small footprint, and low administration requirements, Informix is also targeted at Internet-of-Things solutions, where many of the data-handling requirements can be handled with gateways that embed Informix and connect sensors and devices to the internet.

In April 2017 IBM announced that they were outsourcing development of Informix to Indian IT specialists HCL, and that a number of IBM employees working on Informix would also move to HCL.  As part of this arrangement IBM will continue to market and sell Informix to their customers.

Other products
In addition to the products based on the version 14.1 engine the IBM Informix family also includes a number of legacy database products which are still supported in market.   These include Informix OnLine, Informix Standard Edition (SE) and Informix C-ISAM.    These products are simpler and smaller footprint database engines that are also frequently embedded in third party applications.   Collectively these products are often referred to as the "Informix Classics".

The IBM Informix family also includes a client-side development environment, the Client-SDK, which supports a number of different environments including .net for Windows developers and a variety of protocols for Unix and Linux environments. Obsolete and non-IBM Informix heritage products can run via emulation on modern hardware.

Training and certification
IBM Training includes a complete set of core Data Servers Training courses that apply to Informix. These courses delve into many essential Informix concepts, from fundamentals to advanced SQL topics.

As part of IBM's Academic Initiative, IBM is offering Informix software, documentation and training to higher education institutions worldwide through its new Informix on Campus program. IBM is offering an inclusive package of Informix materials to college faculty called "Informix In a Box", which offers hands-on labs and PowerPoints to use in lessons, recorded training for teachers, DVDs with class material and VMware virtual appliance images, as well as T-shirts for students.

Users groups
Users groups remain active in Belgium, Croatia, France, Germany, the United States, and many other countries. The IIUG (International Informix Users Group) acts as a federation of those user groups and provides numerous services to its members.

See also
 Comparison of relational database management systems
 List of relational database management systems

References

External links
 

Client-server database management systems
Data companies
Informix
Proprietary database management systems
Relational database management systems
Relational database management software for Linux